Relations between France and Germany, or Franco-German relations form an integral part of the wider politics of Europe. Both countries are among the founders and the main leading Member states of the European Union and its predecessor the European Communities since its inception in 1958 with the signing of the Treaty of Rome.

General relations between the two countries since 1871, according to  Ulrich Krotz, have had three grand periods: 'hereditary enmity' (down to 1945), 'reconciliation' (1945–1963) and since 1963 the 'special relationship' embodied in a cooperation called Franco-German Friendship. In the context of the European Union, the cooperation between the two countries is immense and intimate. Even though France has at times been eurosceptical in outlook, especially under President Charles de Gaulle, Franco-German agreements and cooperations have always been key to furthering the ideals of European integration.

In recent times, France and Germany are among the most enthusiastic proponents of the further integration of the EU. They are sometimes described as the "twin engine" or "core countries" pushing for moves. A tram straddling the Franco-German border, across the river Rhine from Strasbourg to Kehl, was inaugurated on 28 April 2017 symbolizing the strength of relations between the two countries.

Country comparison

History

Early interactions

Both France and Germany track their history back to the time of Charlemagne, whose vast empire included most of the area of both modern-day France and Germany – as well as the Netherlands, Belgium, Luxembourg, Switzerland, Austria, Slovenia, and northern Italy.

The death of Charlemagne's son Louis the Pious and the following partition of the Frankish Empire in the 843 Treaty of Verdun marked the end of a single state. While the population in both the Western and Eastern kingdoms had relative homogeneous language groups (Gallo-Romanic in West Francia, and Low German and High German in East Francia), Middle Francia was a mere strip of a mostly blurring yet culturally rich language-border-area, roughly between the rivers Meuse and Rhine – and soon partitioned again. After the 880 Treaty of Ribemont, the border between the western and eastern kingdoms remained almost unchanged for some 600 years. Germany went on with a centuries-long attachment with Italy, while France grew into deeper relations with England.

Despite a gradual cultural alienation during the High and Late Middle Ages, social and cultural interrelations remained present through the preeminence of Latin language and Frankish clergy and nobility.

France and Habsburgs

The later Emperor Charles V, a member of the Austrian House of Habsburg, inherited the Low Countries and the Franche-Comté in 1506. When he also inherited Spain in 1516, France was surrounded by Habsburg territories and felt under pressure. The resulting tension between the two powers caused a number of conflicts such as the War of the Spanish Succession, until the Diplomatic Revolution of 1756 made them allies against Prussia.

The Thirty Years' War (1618–1648), devastating large parts of the Holy Roman Empire, fell into this period. Although the war was mostly a conflict between Protestants and Catholics, Catholic France sided with the Protestants against the Austrian-led Catholic Imperial forces. The Peace of Westphalia in 1648 gave France part of Alsace. The 1679 Treaties of Nijmegen consolidated this result by bringing several towns under French control. In 1681, Louis XIV marched into the city of Strasbourg on 30 September, and proclaimed its annexation.

Meanwhile, the expanding Muslim Ottoman Empire became a serious threat to Austria. The Vatican initiated a so-called Holy League against the "hereditary enemy" of Christian Europe ("Erbfeind christlichen Namens"). Far from joining or supporting the common effort of Austria, Germany and Poland, France under Louis XIV of France invaded the Spanish Netherlands in September 1683, a few days before the Battle of Vienna. While Austria was occupied with the Great Turkish War (1683–1699), France initiated the War of the Grand Alliance (1688–1697). The attempt to conquer large parts of southern Germany ultimately failed when German troops were withdrawn from the Ottoman border and moved to the region. However, following a scorched earth policy that caused a large public outcry at the time, French troops devastated large parts of the Palatinate, burning down and levelling numerous cities and towns in southern Germany.

France and Prussia

In the 18th century, the rise of Prussia as a new German power caused the Diplomatic Revolution and an alliance between France, Habsburg and Russia, manifested in 1756 in the Treaty of Versailles and the Seven Years' War against Prussia and Great Britain. Although a German national state was on the horizon, the loyalties of the German population were primarily with smaller states. The French war against Prussia was justified through its role as guarantor of the Peace of Westphalia, and it was in fact fighting on the side of the majority of German states.

Frederick the Great led the defense of Prussia for 7 years, and though heavily outnumbered, defeated his French and Austrian invaders. Prussia and France clashed multiple times, and many more times than the other countries. This started years of hatred between the two countries. Frederick the Great was soon respected by all of his enemies, and Napoleon himself used him as a model for battle.

The civil population still regarded war as a conflict between their authorities, and did not so much distinguish between troops according to the side on which they fought but rather according to how they treated the local population. The personal contacts and mutual respect between French and Prussian officers did not stop entirely while they were fighting each other, and the war resulted in a great deal of cultural exchange between the French occupiers and German population.

Impact of French Revolution and Napoleon
German nationalism emerged as a strong force after 1807, as Napoleon conquered much of Germany and brought in the new ideals of the French Revolution. The French mass conscription for the Revolutionary Wars and the beginning formation of nation states in Europe made war increasingly a conflict between peoples rather than a conflict between authorities carried out on the backs of their subjects.

Napoleon put an end to the millennium-old Holy Roman Empire in 1806, forming his own Confederation of the Rhine, and reshaped the political map of the German states, which were still divided. The wars, often fought in Germany and with Germans on both sides as in the Battle of the Nations at Leipzig, also marked the beginning of what was explicitly called French–German hereditary enmity. Napoleon directly incorporated German-speaking areas such as the Rhineland and Hamburg into his First French Empire and treated the monarchs of the remaining German states as vassals. Modern German nationalism was born in opposition to French domination under Napoleon. In the recasting of the map of Europe after Napoleon's defeat, the German-speaking territories in the Rhineland adjoining France were put under the rule of Prussia.

France and Bavaria
Bavaria as the third-largest state in Germany after 1815 enjoyed much warmer relations with France than the larger Prussia or Austria. From 1670 onwards the two countries were allies for almost a century, primarily to counter Habsburg ambitions to incorporate Bavaria into Austria. This alliance was renewed after the rise of Napoleon to power with a friendship treaty in 1801 and a formal alliance in August 1805, pushed for by the Bavarian Minister Maximilian von Montgelas. With French support Bavaria was elevated to the status of a Kingdom in 1806. Bavaria supplied 30,000 troops for the invasion of Russia in 1812, of which very few returned. With the decline of the First French Empire Bavaria opted to switch sides on 8 October 1813 and left the French alliance in favour of an Austrian one through the Treaty of Ried.

Nineteenth century

German states defeat France, 1870-1871
 
During the first half of the 19th century, many Germans looked forward to a unification of the German states; one issue was whether Catholic Austria would be a part.  German nationalists believed that a united Germany would replace France as the world's dominant land power. This argument was aided by demographic changes: since the Middle Ages, France had the largest population in Western Europe, but in the 19th century its population stagnated (a trend which continued until the second half of the 20th century), and the population of the German states overtook it and continued to rapidly increase.

The eventual unification of Germany was triggered by the Franco-German War in 1870 and subsequent French defeat. German forces defeated the French armies at the Battle of Sedan. Finally, in the Treaty of Frankfurt, reached after a lengthy siege of Paris, France was forced to cede the mostly Germanic-speaking Alsace-Lorraine territory (consisting of most of Alsace and a quarter of Lorraine), and pay an indemnity of five billion francs. Thereafter, Germany was the leading land power.

[[File:Au Reviour - Germany and France.jpg|thumb|270px|John Tenniel: Au Revoir!, Punch'''' 6 August 1881]]
Although initially against it, Bismarck eventually gave into the Army and to intense public demand in Germany for acquisition of the border provinces of Alsace and Lorraine, thereby turning France into a permanent, deeply committed enemy. Theodore Zeldin says, "Revenge and the recovery of  Alsace-Lorraine became a principal object of French policy for the next forty years. That Germany was France's enemy became the basic fact of international relations." Bismarck's solution was to make France a pariah nation, encouraging royalty to ridicule its new republican status, and building complex alliances with the other major powers – Austria, Russia, and Britain – to keep France isolated diplomatically.Mark Hewitson, "Germany and France before the First World War: A Reassessment of Wilhelmine Foreign Policy" English Historical Review (2000) 115#462 pp. 570-606 in JSTOR

Late 19th century

The short-term French reaction to defeat in the Franco-Prussian War of 1870–1871 was Revanchism: a deep sense of bitterness, hatred and demand for revenge against Germany, especially because of the loss of Alsace and Lorraine. Paintings that emphasized the humiliation of the defeat came in high demand, such as those by Alphonse de Neuville.

The  Alsace-Lorraine issue remained a minor theme after 1880, and Republicans and Socialists systematically downplayed the issue and the monarchists (who emphasized the issue) faded away. Revanchism was not a major cause of war in 1914 because it faded after 1880. J.F.V. Keiger says, "By the 1880s Franco-German relations were relatively good."Frederic H. Seager, "The Alsace-Lorraine Question in France, 1871-1914." From the Ancien Régime to the Popular Front: Essays in the History of Modern France edited by Charles K. Warner, (1969): 111-26.

After 1880, the rapid growth in the population and economy of Germany left France increasingly far behind.  In the 1890s relationships remained good as Germany supported France during its difficulties with Britain over African colonies.  Any lingering harmony collapsed in 1905, when Germany took an aggressively hostile position to French claims to Morocco. There was talk of war and France strengthened its ties with Britain and Russia.

First World War

The French public had very little interest in foreign affairs and elite French opinion was strongly opposed to war with its more powerful neighbor.  French foreign policy was based on a fear that Germany was larger and steadily growing more powerful.  In 1914 the chief pressure group was the Parti colonial, a coalition of 50 organizations with a combined total of only 5,000 members.  When war broke out in 1914, recovery of the two lost provinces became France's primary war aim.

After Bismarck's removal in 1890, French efforts to isolate Germany became successful; with the formation of the Triple Entente, Germany began to feel encircled.  Foreign minister Delcassé, especially, went to great pains to woo Russia and Great Britain. Key markers were the Franco-Russian Alliance of 1894, the 1904 Entente Cordiale with Great Britain, and finally the Anglo-Russian Entente in 1907 which became the Triple Entente. This formal alliance with Russia, and informal alignment with Britain, against Germany and Austria eventually led Russia and Britain to enter World War I as France's Allies.G.P. Gooch, Before the war: studies in diplomacy (1936), chapter on Delcassé pp 87-186.

1920s

The Allied victory saw France regain Alsace-Lorraine and briefly resume its old position as the leading land power on the European continent. France was the leading proponent of harsh peace terms against Germany at the Paris Peace Conference. Since the war had been fought on French soil, it had destroyed much of French infrastructure and industry, and France had suffered the highest number of casualties proportionate to population. Much French opinion wanted the Rhineland, the section of Germany adjoining France and the old focus of French ambition, to be detached from Germany as an independent country; in the end they settled for a promise that the Rhineland would be demilitarized, and heavy German reparation payments. On the remote Eastern end of the German Empire, the Memel territory was separated from the rest of East Prussia and occupied by France before being annexed by Lithuania. To alleged German failure to pay reparations under the Treaty of Versailles in 1923, France responded with the occupation of the Rhineland and the industrial Ruhr area of Germany, the center of German coal and steel production, until 1925. Also, the French-dominated International Olympic Committee banned Germany from the Olympic Games of 1920 and 1924, illustrating French desire to isolate Germany.

Locarno treaties of 1925

In late 1924 German foreign minister Gustav Stresemann made his highest priority the restoration of German prestige and privileges as a leading European nation. French withdrawal from the occupation of the Ruhr was scheduled for January 1925, but Stresemann sensed that France was very nervous about its security and might cancel the withdrawal. He realized that France deeply desired a British guarantee of its postwar borders, but that London was reluctant.  Stresemann came up with a plan whereby all sides would get what they wanted through a series of guarantees set out in a series of treaties. British Foreign Minister Austen Chamberlain enthusiastically agreed. France realized that its occupation of the Ruhr had caused more financial and diplomatic damage than it was worth, and went along with the plan. The conference of foreign ministers they convened in the Swiss resort of Locarno and agreed on a plan. The first treaty was the most critical one: a mutual guarantee of the frontiers of Belgium, France, and Germany, which was guaranteed by Britain and Italy. The second and third treaties called for arbitration between Germany and Belgium, and Germany and France, regarding future disputes. The fourth and fifth were similar arbitration treaties between Germany and Poland, and Germany and Czechoslovakia. Poland especially, and Czechoslovakia as well, felt threatened by the Locarno agreements and these treaties were attempts to reassure them. Thanks to the Dawes plan, Germany was now making regular reparations payments. The success of the Locarno agreements Led to the admission of Germany to the League of Nations. In September 1926, with a seat on its counsel as a permanent member.  The result was the euphoric "Spirit of Locarno" across Europe—a sense that it was possible to achieve  peace and a permanent system of guaranteeing that peace.

1930s

The Great Depression on 1929-33 soured the mood in France, and plunged Germany into economic hardship and violent internal convulsions and upheavals. From 1933 under Adolf Hitler, Germany began to pursue an aggressive policy in Europe. Meanwhile, France in the 1930s was tired, politically divided, and above all dreaded another war, which the French feared would again be fought on their soil for the third time, and again destroy a large percentage of their young men. France's stagnant population meant that it would find it difficult to withhold the sheer force of numbers of a German invasion; it was estimated Germany could put two men of fighting age in the field for every French soldier. Thus in the 1930s the French, with their British allies, pursued a policy of appeasement of Germany, failing to respond to the remilitarization of the Rhineland, although this put the German army on a larger stretch of the French border.

Second World War
Finally, however, Hitler pushed France and Britain too far, and they jointly declared war when Germany invaded Poland in September 1939. But France remained exhausted and in no mood for a rerun of 1914–18. There was little enthusiasm and much dread in France at the prospect of actual warfare after the Phoney War. When the Germans launched their blitzkrieg invasion of France in 1940, the French Army crumbled within weeks, and with Britain retreating, an atmosphere of humiliation and defeat swept France.

A new government under Marshal Philippe Pétain surrendered, and German forces occupied most of the country. A minority of the French forces escaped abroad and continued the fight under General Charles de Gaulle and Free France. On the other hand, the French Resistance conducted sabotage operations inside German-occupied France. To support the invasion of Normandy of 1944, various groups increased their sabotage and guerrilla attacks; organizations such as the Maquis derailed trains, blew up ammunition depots, and ambushed Germans, for instance at Tulle. The 2nd SS Panzer Division Das Reich, which came under constant attack and sabotage on their way across the country to Normandy, suspected the village of Oradour-sur-Glane of harboring resistance members, arms and explosives. In retaliation, they destroyed the town in the Oradour-sur-Glane massacre, killing 642 of its inhabitants.

There was also a free French army fighting with the Allies, numbering almost five hundred thousand men by June 1944, one million by December and 1.3 million by the end of the war. By the war's end, the French army occupied south-west Germany and a part of Austria.

France, Germany and United Europe
Pre 1944 ideas of France-German cooperation
Marshal Petain, who ruled France under German supervision, 1940–44, adopted the ideology of National Revolution which was originally based on ideas which had been discussed for years.  When the Franco-German reconciliation committee "Comité France-Allemagne" ("French-German Friendship Committee") founded in 1935 in Paris it was an important element for Germany to get closer to France. It adopted Pro-European, Pro-German, anti British, anti liberal political and economic views. Key members of the Committee became the key leaders of the French collaborators with Nazis after 1940.Robert Soucy, French Fascism, The Second Wave, 1933-1939 (1995).

When Marshal Petain officially proclaimed the collaboration policy with Nazi Germany in June 1941, he justified it to the French people as an essential need for the New European Order and to keep the unity of France. Therefore, much of WW2 French propaganda was pro-European, exactly as German propaganda was. Therefore, a group called "Group Collaboration" had been established during the war in France, and led a myriad of conferences promoting Pro-Europeanism. The very first time the expression "European Community" was used was at its first sessions, as  well as many conferences and guests lectures sponsored by the German government, propagating French-German reconciliation, French renewal and European solidarity.

Post war Europe

The war left Europe in a weak position and divided between capitalism in the West, and communism in the East. For the first time in the history of Europe both Americans and Soviets had a strategic foothold on the continent. Defeated Germany was under the control of the U.S., USSR, United Kingdom and France until 1949. Soviet troops remained in those countries in Eastern Europe that had been liberated by the Red Army from the Nazis and ensured the political success of Communist parties controlled by the Kremlin.Cyril E. Bloack et al. Rebirth: A Political History Of Europe Since World War II (2nd ed. 200) pp 57-103.
 
The French under De Gaulle hoped to be a balancing act in 1945–46.  French fears of a resurgent Germany made it reluctant to support the plan to merge the British and American zones of occupation. However growing anger at the Soviets behaviour in Poland, and the need for American economic assistance, led the French to merge their zone into what became West Germany.

In 1947 the American Secretary of State, George Marshall announced the Marshall Plan to help economic recovery, economic integration, and business-oriented modernization in Europe. Large sums went to France and Germany, which helped restore trade and financial relations. The Marshall Plan recipients set up the Organisation for European Economic Co-operation (OEEC) in 1948.

Franco-German cooperation in the European Union
Earlier in 1948, there were significant key leaders in the French civil service who favoured an agreement with the Germans as well as an integrated Europe that would include Germany. The French European Department was working on a coal and steel agreement for the Ruhr-Lorraine-Luxembourg area, with equal rights for all. One French civil servant recommended 'laying down the bases of a Franco-German economic and political association that would slowly become integrated into the framework of the evolving Western organization'. Deighton strongly illustrated that the French leaders sought the cooperation with the Germans as key factor on the path of integrated Europe.

On a more practical level the increased level of cooperation between West-Germany and France were driven by de Gaulle’s desire to build a power-bloc independently of the US, while Adenauer sought a fast integration into the western structures to receive full rights for the still occupied West German state as well as protection against the soviet threat. While the issue of dependency on the USA remained a sore spot at least for as long as DeGaulle remained in office (e.g. the German parliament included a pro-NATO preamble into the Élysée Accords which caused considerable consternation with the French government). However their shared interest in increased cooperation still existed and was also driven by strong support in the respective civil society, as it was seen as the best solution to prevent further bloodshed between the two nations.

As a sequence, Jean Monnet, who has been described as  the founder father and the chief architect of European Unity, announced the French Schuman plan of 9 May 1950, which led to the founding a year later of the European Coal and Steel Community (ECSC). The plan brought the reconciliation of France and Germany, the axis of political European integration, furthermore, the plan announced the proposal of a European army. This led to the signing of the treaty of the European Defence Community (EDC) in 1952. The main purpose of establishing such army was to create a "European security identity", through closer Franco-German military and security cooperation.

In like manner, the German minister of economics Ludwig Erhard, created a significant evolution in the German economy and a durable, well established trading relationship between the Federal Republic and its European neighbours as well. Later on when the Treaty of Rome came into action in 1958, it took the responsibility to strengthen and sustain the new political and economic relationships that had developed between the German nation and its former victims in Western Europe. The treaty beside it included side deals; it created a customs union and established the rules needed to make the competition mechanism work properly.

As a sequence of this, booming European economies, fired by Germany, led to the formation of the new customs union known as the European Economic Community (EEC). But it did not go well as the organization of Europe, because only the members of the coal and steel community 'ECSC' (" the six": Belgium, France, Italy, Luxembourg, the Netherlands and West Germany) joined the EEC. Seven of the remaining nations belonging to the Organization of European Economic Cooperation (OEEC) which administered the Marshall Plan, did not join the EEC but instead formed an alternative body, the European Free Trade Association (EFTA). It was a free trade area as opposed to a customs union with common external tariffs and a political agenda, competing with the EEC as it was remarkably successful.

Friendship
 

With the threat of the Soviet Union during the Cold War, West Germany sought its national security in the re-integration into Western Europe, while France sought after a reestablishment as a Grande Nation. The post-war Franco-German cooperation is based on the Élysée Treaty, which was signed by Charles de Gaulle and Konrad Adenauer on 22 January 1963. The treaty contained a number of agreements for joint cooperation in foreign policy, economic and military integration and exchange of student education.

The treaty was signed under difficult political situations at that time and criticized both by opposition parties in France and Germany, as well as from the United Kingdom and the United States. Opposition from the United Kingdom and the United States was answered by an added preamble which postulated a close cooperation with those (including NATO) and a targeted German reunification.

The treaty achieved a lot in initiating European integration and a stronger Franco-German co-position in transatlantic relations.

The initial concept for the Franco-German cooperation however dates back a lot further than the Élysée Treaty and is based on the overcoming the centuries of Franco-German hostilities within Europe. It was compared to a re-establishment of Charlemagne's European empire as it existed before division by the Treaty of Verdun in 843 AD.

The Schuman declaration of 1950 is regarded by some as the founding of Franco-German cooperation, as well as of the European Coal and Steel Community (ECSC) of 1951, which also included Italy, Belgium, the Netherlands and Luxembourg.

The cooperation was accompanied by strong personal alliance in various degrees:
Konrad Adenauer and Charles de Gaulle (1958–1963)
Willy Brandt and Georges Pompidou (1969–1974)
Helmut Schmidt and Valéry Giscard d'Estaing (1974–1981)
Helmut Kohl and François Mitterrand (1982–1995)
Gerhard Schröder and Jacques Chirac (1998–2005)
Angela Merkel and Nicolas Sarkozy (2007–2012)
Angela Merkel and François Hollande (2012–2017)
Angela Merkel and Emmanuel Macron (2017–2021)
Olaf Scholz and Emmanuel Macron (2021–present)

Alliances
Economic alliances

European Space Agency (with many other European states)
EADS (with two CEOs)
Airbus (also present in the UK and Spain)

Franco-German collaborative enterprises include;
Areva
Aventis
ODDO BHF, a Franco German bank

Cultural alliances
 Promotion of French and German language in both countries (See Alsace).
 Creation of a joint Franco-German History Coursebook to promote a "shared vision of History"
 The Franco-German University was created in 1999 to enable cooperation in tertiary education.
 Arte, Franco-German cultural TV-channel

Military alliances
From its inception during the 1960s the Eurocorps has contained large contingents of French and German troops at its core, while other EU nations have contributed soldiers to the multinational force. The Franco-German Brigade takes much of its infantry from France and much of its armour from Germany.

 Resident diplomatic missions 
 France has an embassy in Berlin and consulates-general in Düsseldorf, Frankfurt, Hamburg, Munich, Saarbrücken and Stuttgart.
 Germany has an embassy in Paris and consulates-general in Bordeaux, Lyon, Marseille and Strasbourg.

See also
 List of Ambassadors of France to Germany
 List of Ambassadors of Germany to France
 Causes of World War II
 International relations (1814–1919)
 France–United Kingdom relations
 Germany–United Kingdom relations
 Netherlands–United Kingdom relations 
 France–United States relations
 Germany–United States relations 
 France–Netherlands relations 
 Germany–Netherlands relations 
 Belgium–France relations 
 Belgium–Germany relations
 Foreign relations of France
 Foreign relations of Germany
 History of Europe

Notes and references

Further reading
 Keiger, J.F.V. France and the World since 1870 (2001), a wide-ranging survey to the 1990s
 Krotz, Ulrich. History and foreign policy in France and Germany (Springer, 2015).

To 1945

 Albrecht-Carrié, René. A Diplomatic History of Europe Since the Congress of Vienna (1958), 736pp; basic survey
 Andrew, Christopher, Théophile Delcassé and the Making of the Entente Cordiale: a Reappraisal of French Foreign Policy 1898-1905 (1968)
 Brandenburg, Erich. (1927) From Bismarck to the World War: A History of German Foreign Policy 1870–1914 (1927) online.
 Burrin, Philippe. France Under the Germans, Collaboration and Compromise. (1996) 1940-44. 
 Bury, J.P.T. "Diplomatic History 1900–1912, in C. L. Mowat, ed. The New Cambridge Modern History: Vol. XII: The Shifting Balance of World Forces 1898-1945 (2nd ed. 1968) online pp 112-139.
 Carroll, E. Malcolm, French Public Opinion and Foreign Affairs 1870–1914 (1931).  online.
 Carroll, E. Malcolm. Germany and the great powers, 1866–1914: A study in public opinion and foreign policy (1938)  Clark, Christopher. The Sleepwalkers: How Europe Went to War in 1914 (2013)
 Gooch, G.P. History of modern Europe, 1878–1919 (2nd ed. 1956) pp 386-413.  online, diplomatic history
 Gooch, G. P. Franco-German relations, 1871-1914 (1923) online 80pp
 Gordon, Bertram, ed. Historical Dictionary of World War II France. The Occupation, Vichy and the Resistance, 1938-1946. (1998).
 Hensel, Paul R. "The Evolution of the Franco-German Rivalry" pp 86–124  in William R. Thompson, ed. Great power rivalries (1999) online
 Hewitson, Mark. "Germany and France before the First World War: a reassessment of Wilhelmine foreign policy." English Historical Review 115.462 (2000): 570-606; argues Germany had a growing sense of military superiority. online
 Jackson, Julian. France, The Dark Years, 1940-1944 (2001), a major scholarly survey. 
 Keiger, John F.V. France and the origins of the First World War (1983), a major scholarly survey.

 Lambi, Ivo Nikolai. The navy and German power politics, 1862-1914 (Routledge, 2019).
 Langer, William. An Encyclopedia of World History (5th ed. 1973); highly detailed outline of events online
 Langer, William.  European Alliances and Alignments 1870–1890 (1950); advanced history online
 Langer, William. The Diplomacy of Imperialism 1890–1902 (1950); advanced history online
 Lichtenberger, Henry. Relations Between France and Germany (1923) online
 MacMillan, Margaret. The War That Ended Peace: The Road to 1914 (2013), full-scale diplomatic history
 Nolan, Michael E. The inverted mirror: mythologizing the enemy in France and Germany, 1898-1914 (Berghahn Books, 2005).
 Paxton, Robert. Vichy France, Old Guard and New Order, 1940-1944 (1972). 
 Piller, Elisabeth Marie. "The Transatlantic Dynamics of European Cultural Diplomacy: Germany, France and the Battle for US Affections in the 1920s." Contemporary European History 30.2 (2021): 248-264. online
 Rich, Norman. Great Power Diplomacy: 1814–1914 (1991), comprehensive survey 
 Rich, Norman. Great Power Diplomacy since 1914 (2003) comprehensive survey
 Schuman, Frederick L. War and Diplomacy in the French Republic (1931) online
 Seager, Frederic H. "The Alsace-Lorraine Question in France, 1871-1914." From the Ancien Régime to the Popular Front: Essays in the History of Modern France edited by Charles K. Warner, (1969): 111-26.
 Steiner, Zara S. The lights that failed: European international history, 1919–1933 (2007), 940pp detailed coverage; online
 Steiner, Zara. The Triumph of the Dark: European International History, 1933–1939  (2011) detailed coverage 1236pp
 Taylor, A.J.P. The Struggle for Mastery in Europe 1848–1918 (1954) 638pp; advanced history and analysis of major diplomacy.
 Varley, Karine. Under the shadow of defeat: the war of 1870–71 in French memory (Springer, 2008).
 Watt, D.C. "Diplomatic History 1930–1939" in C. L. Mowat, ed. The New Cambridge Modern History: Vol. XII: The Shifting Balance of World Forces 1898-1945 (2nd ed. 1968) online pp 684-734.
 Weinberg, Gerhard.The Foreign Policy of Hitler's Germany: Diplomatic Revolution in Europe, 1933-36 (v. 1) (1971);  The Foreign Policy of Hitler's Germany: Starting World War II, 1937–1939 (vol 2) (University of Chicago Press, 1980) .
 Wetzel, David. A Duel of Giants: Bismarck, Napoleon III, and the Origins of the Franco-Prussian War (2003)
 Young, Robert France and the Origins of the Second World War (1996)

Post 1945
 Baun, Michael J. "The Maastricht Treaty as High Politics: Germany, France, and European Integration." Political Science Quarterly (1996): 110#4 pp. 605-624 in JSTOR
 Friend, Julius W. The Linchpin: French-German Relations, 1950–1990 (1991) online
 Friend, Julius W. Unequal Partners: French-German Relations, 1989–2000. (Greenwood 2001)
  Fryer, W. R. "The Republic and the Iron Chancellor: The Pattern of Franco-German Relations, 1871–1890," Transactions of the Royal Historical Society (1979), Vol. 29, pp 169-185.
 Gillingham, John. Coal, steel, and the rebirth of Europe, 1945-1955: the Germans and French from Ruhr conflict to Economic Community (Cambridge UP, 2004).
 Gordon, Philip H.  France, Germany and the Western Alliance. (Westview 1995)  .
 Gunther, Scott. "A New Identity for Old Europe: How and Why the French Imagined Françallemagne in Recent Years." French Politics, Culture & Society  (2011) 29#1
 Krotz, Ulrich. "Three eras and possible futures: a long-term view on the Franco-German relationship a century after the First World War," International Affairs (March 2014) 20#2 pp 337-350
 Krotz, Ulrich, and Joachim Schild. Shaping Europe: France, Germany, and Embedded Bilateralism from the Elysée Treaty to Twenty-First Century Politics (Oxford University Press, 2013)
 Krotz, Ulrich. "Regularized intergovernmentalism: France–Germany and beyond (1963–2009)." Foreign Policy Analysis (2010) 6#2 pp: 147-185.
 Krotz, Ulrich. Structure as Process: The Regularized Intergovernmentalism of Franco-German Bilateralism (Minda de Gunzburg Center for European Studies, Harvard University, 2002) online
 Krotz, Ulrich. "Social Content of the International Sphere: Symbols and Meaning in Franco-German Relations" (Minda de Gunzburg Center for European Studies, 2002.) online
 Kulski, W.W. DeGaulle And The World: The Foreign Policy Of The Fifth French Republic (1966)
 Rich, Norman. Great Power Diplomacy since 1914 (2003) comprehensive survey 
 Schild, Joachim. "Leadership in Hard Times: Germany, France, and the Management of the Eurozone Crisis." German Politics & Society (2013) 31#1 pp: 24-47.

 Schramm, Lucas. "Bilateral leadership in critical moments: France, Germany, and the management of major European integration crises." Comparative European Politics (2023): 1-22. online

 Sutton, Michael. France and the construction of Europe, 1944–2007: the geopolitical imperative (Berghahn Books, 2011)
 Tint, Herbert. French Foreign Policy since the Second World War (1972) [https://archive.org/details/frenchforeignpol00herb/page/n0  online
] pp 28–165.
 Urwin, Derek W. The community of Europe: A history of European integration since 1945'' (Routledge, 2014).

External links
France and Germany Celebrate 50 Years of Friendship (Spiegel Online interview with Jacques Delors and Joschka Fischer)
Spanish irritation of excessive dominance of the EU agenda by France & Germany
The Commissioner for Franco-German Cooperation
La Gazette de Berlin The Newspaper in French for Germany (1 Page in German)
The Franco-German Youth Office (FGYO)

 
Germany
Bilateral relations of Germany
Bottom-up regional groups within the European Union